The Fair Folk is an anthology of fantasy stories edited by Marvin Kaye. It was published by Science Fiction Book Club in January 2005. The anthology contains novelettes and novellas centered on fairies. The anthology itself won the 2006 World Fantasy Award for Best Anthology.

Contents

 Introduction: Fairies Fearsome, Friendly and Funny, by Marvin Kaye
 "UOUS", by Tanith Lee
 "Grace Notes", by Megan Lindholm
 "The Gypsies in the Wood", by Kim Newman
 "The Kelpie", by Patricia A. McKillip
 "An Embarrassment of Elves", by Craig Shaw Gardner
 "Except the Queen", by Jane Yolen and Midori Snyder
 Afterword: Some Facts (?) About Fairies, by Marvin Kaye

Reprints
Ace Books, February 2007.
Ace Books, December 2007.

References

2005 anthologies
Fantasy anthologies